Novoakbulatovo (Yañı Aqbulat; , Kürzö) is a rural locality (a village) and the administrative centre of Akbulatovsky Selsoviet, Mishkinsky District, Bashkortostan, Russia. The population was 514 as of 2010. There are 6 streets.

Geography 
Novoakbulatovo is located 10 km south of Mishkino (the district's administrative centre) by road. Yandyganovo is the nearest rural locality.

References 

Rural localities in Mishkinsky District